Shelly Zegart was born in Western Pennsylvania in 1941. In 1968, Zegart moved with her family to Louisville, Kentucky. Zegart's love for quilts began in the 1970s. Ever since then, she had been a quilt collector, lecturer, curator exhibitions and even an author on any and all aspects of quilt aesthetics and history. Zegart owns a personal collection of nineteenth- and twentieth- century quilts. Zegart has been popular with the Japanese and other international aficionados.

Her lecture topics include, "Quilts as Women's Art", "Political Quilts" and "Misperceptions versus Reality in the World of Old Quilts." Zegart's first international project was an exhibit in 1987 of Kentucky quilts for the Women's Committee of the National Trust of Australia in Sydney.

Shelly Zegart is one of the founding directors of The Kentucky Quilt Project, the first statewide quilt documentation project in the United States. As such, she is a pioneer of quilt documentation in the United States. Zegart's book American Quilt Collections: Antique Quilt Masterpieces was published by Nihon Vogue in Tokyo (1998). Most recently, she was Executive Producer and Host of the documentary series Why Quilts Matter, History, Art & Politics. The series aired on public broadcasting television stations across the United States.

References

Quilters
1941 births
Living people